Dukes are titles and office of nobility.

Dukes or The Dukes may refer to:

Arts and entertainment

Film and television
 The Dukes (TV series), a 1983 animated spinoff of The Dukes of Hazzard
 The Dukes (film), a 2007 film starring Chazz Palminteri

Music
 The Dukes (Australian band), a 1990s rock band
 The Dukes (British band), a 1970s rock band featuring Miller Anderson and Jimmy McCulloch
 The Dukes, their 1979 album
 The Dukes (New Zealand band), a rock band formed in 2003
 Steve Earle & the Dukes, American band formed in the 1970s

Fictional characters
 Fred J. Dukes, Marvel Comics supervillain the Blob
 Oliver Dukes, primary antagonist in Maurice Walsh's 1950 novel Trouble in the Glen and its 1954 film adaptation

Sports teams
 Albuquerque Dukes, a former Triple A baseball team based in Albuquerque, New Mexico, United States
 Duluth-Superior Dukes (1956–70), a minor league baseball team
 Duluth–Superior Dukes (1993–2002 team), a professional baseball team
 Duquesne Dukes, the athletic teams of Duquesne University in Pittsburgh
 James Madison Dukes, the sports teams of James Madison University, Harrisonburg, Virginia, United States
 Ingolstadt Dukes, an American football team from Ingolstadt, Germany
 Wellington Dukes, a Junior "A" ice hockey team from Wellington, Ontario, Canada

Other uses
 Dukes (surname), including a list of people and fictional characters
 Dukes (ward), Sefton, Merseyside, England
 The Dukes, Lancaster, formerly known as the Duke's Playhouse, a theatre in Lancaster, England
 Dukes brand cricket ball, manufactured by British Cricket Balls Ltd
 Dukes Creek, Georgia, United States
 Duke's Mayonnaise, a condiment created by Eugenia Duke
 The Dukes, a hacker group more commonly known as Cozy Bear

See also
 Dukes classification, a system for classifying colorectal cancers
 Duke's, an Indian soft drink brand of Duke and Sons
 The Duhks, a Canadian folk band
 Duke (disambiguation)